Kok Dohora Union is a union of Kalihati Upazila, Tangail District, Bangladesh. It is situated 26 km northeast of Tangail, the district headquarters.

Demographics

According to Population Census 2011 performed by Bangladesh Bureau of Statistics, The total population of Kok Dohora union is 28770. There are 7270 households in total.

Education

The literacy rate of Kok Dohora Union is 37.8% (Male-40.3%, Female-35.4%).

See also
 Union Councils of Tangail District

References

Populated places in Tangail District
Unions of Kalihati Upazila